Francesca Schiavone was the defending champion but decided not to participate.

Alizé Cornet won the title, defeating Lucie Hradecká in the final 7–6(7–4), 6–0.

Seeds

Draw

Finals

Top half

Bottom half

Qualifying

Seeds

Qualifiers

Qualifying draw

First qualifier

Second qualifier

Third qualifier

Fourth qualifier

References
Main Draw
Qualifying Draw

Internationaux de Strasbourgandnbsp;- Singles
2013 Singles
2013 in French tennis